Deal or No Deal is the name of several closely related television game shows, including:

Deal or No Deal (Arab World)
Deal or No Deal (Argentina)
Deal or No Deal (Australian game show)
Deal or No Deal (Bulgaria)
Deal or No Deal (Chile)
Deal or No Deal (Denmark)
Deal or No Deal (Ireland)
Deal or No Deal (Germany)
Deal or No Deal (Hong Kong)
Deal or No Deal (Israel)
Deal or No Deal (Maltese Game Show)
Deal or No Deal (Netherlands)
Deal or No Deal (New Zealand)
Deal or No Deal (Norway)
Kapamilya, Deal or No Deal, (Philippine version)
Deal or No Deal (Poland)
Deal or No Deal (Singapore)
Deal or No Deal (Slovenia)
Deal or No Deal (South Africa)
Deal or No Deal (Spain)
Deal or No Deal (Sweden)
Deal or No Deal (Thailand)
Deal or No Deal (Tunisia)
Deal or No Deal (UK game show)
Deal or No Deal (U.S. game show), the NBC primetime version
Deal or No Deal (U.S. syndicated game show), the NBC syndicated version

Deal or No Deal may also refer to:
"Deal Or No Deal" (Prison Break), an episode of the television series Prison Break
Deal or No Deal (video game), based on the television show
Deal or No Deal (album), a 2009 album by Wiz Khalifa